Shandite is a sulfide mineral with chemical formula: Ni3Pb2S2.  It was discovered in 1948 by the German mineralogist Paul Raumdohr who named it named after Scottish petrologist, Samuel James Shand (1882–1957).  Ramdohr characterized shandite by its metallic luster and a brass-yellow color.  It has a specific gravity of 8.92, and a Mohs hardness value of 4.  Shandite is commonly found as an inclusion in other minerals such as Heazelwoodite Ni3S2 or serpentine.  

Its crystal system is trigonal hexagonal scalenohedral with symbol 2/m. It belongs to the space group Rm.  Shandite is an anisotropic mineral, which means it has different properties when being viewed from different directions.  In cross-polarized light it appears as gray blue or yellow-brown colors.  It also has very distinct relief, which means it stands out against its mounting medium and can be easily seen.  It has an index of refraction of 1.54, which is the measure of the speed of light through the substance.  In plane polarized light, shandite has a creamy white color and distinct pleochroism, which is the property that makes it appear to be different colors at different angles.  It has strong birefringence, which is the decomposition of light into two rays, and appears dark blue and gray.  

In subsequent decades several compounds with shandite type structure were synthesized by several chemists. The group of compounds M3A2Ch2 with shandite type crystal structures was subsequently called "shandites". They include Co3Sn2S2 = Sn2Co3S2 = Co3/2SnS that became famous in recent years as layered half metal ferromagnet and topological semi metal including kagome layers of cobalt atoms.

References 

 Paul Ramdohr: Über das Vorkommen von Heazlewoodit Ni3S2 und über ein neues ihn begleitendes Mineral: Shandit Ni3Pb2S2. Sitzungsberichte der Deutsch. Akad. d. Wiss. Berlin, Math-nat. Klasse. Band 6, 1948, pp.  1–30.
 Richard Weihrich, Rainer Pöttgen, Florian Pielnhofer: From Laboratory Press to Spins with Giant Effects. Angewandte Chemie. Internat. Ed., Vol. 57, pp.  15642-15644, doi.org/10.1002/anie.201811456. 
 Manfred Zabel, Sigrid Wandinger, Klaus-Jürgen Range: Ternäre Chalkogenide M3M2'X2 mit Shandit-Struktur. Zeitschrift für Naturforschung, volume 34b, 1979, pp.  238–241.
 R. Weihrich, I. Anusca: Half Antiperovskites III: crystallographic and electronic structure effects in Co-Shandites. Zeitschrift für Anorganische und Allgemeine Chemie. volume 632, 2006, pp.  1531, doi:10.1002/zaac.200500524. 
 R. Weihrich, S. F. Matar, V. Eyert, F. Rau, M. Zabel, M. Andratschke, I. Anusca, T. Bernert: Structure, ordering, and bonding of half antiperovskites: PbNi3/2S and BiPd3/2S. Progress in Solid State Chemistry. volume 35, 2007, 309–327, doi:10.1016/j.progsolidstchem.2007.01.011
 E. Liu, Y. Sun, N. Kumar, L. Muechler, A. Sun, L. Jiao, S.-Y. Yang, D. Liu, A. Liang, Q. Xu, J. Kroder, V. Sgß, H. Borrmann, C. Shekhar, Z.Wang, C. Xi, W. Wang, W. Schnelle, S.Wirth, Y. Chen, S. T. B. Goennenwein, C. Felser: Giant anomalous Hall effect in a ferromagnetic kagome-lattice semimetal. Nature Physics volume 14, 11, 2018, 1125–1131, doi:10.1038/s41567-018-0234-5. 
 W. Schnelle, A. Leithe‐Jasper , H. Rosner , F. M. Schappacher, R. Pöttgen, F. Pielnhofer, R. Weihrich: Ferromagnetic ordering and half-metallic state of Sn2Co3S2 with the shandite-type structure. Phys. Rev. B, volume 88, 2013, 1444041-8, DOI:doi.org/10.1103/PhysRevB.88.144404(?!) 
 Mohamed A. Kassem, Yoshikazu Tabata, Takeshi Waki, Hiroyuki Nakamura: Low-field anomalous magnetic phase in the kagome-lattice shandite. Physical Review B, volume 96, 2017, 014429.  

Sulfide minerals
Lead minerals
Nickel minerals
Trigonal minerals
Minerals in space group 166